Volodin (masculine) or Volodina (feminine) is a Russian surname that is derived from Volodya, a pet form of the male given name Vladimir, and literally means Volodya's. Notable people with the surname include:

 Aleksandr Volodin, (born 1990), Estonian chess player
 Aleksandr Volodin (born 1988), Estonian footballer
 Aleksandr Volodin (1935–2017), Soviet and Russian linguist
 Aleksandr Volodin (1919–2001), Soviet and Russian playwright, screenwriter and poet
 Aleksey Volodin (born 1977), Russian pianist
 Denis Volodin (born 1982), Kazakhstani professional footballer
 Eduard Volodin (1939–2001), Russian philosopher and publicist
 Eugenia Volodina (born 1984), Russian model
 Margarita Volodina (born 1932), Soviet Russian actress
 Nikolay Volodin (1977–2002), Russian militarist, Hero of Second Chechen War
 Vadim Volodin, Russian photographer
 Vasilisa Volodina (born 1974), Russian television presenter
 Vyacheslav Volodin (born 1964), Russian politician

Russian-language surnames